The Kappa Child is a novel by Hiromi Goto, published in 2001. Goto's novel focuses on a Japanese-Canadian woman and her family. The narrator believes herself to have immaculately conceived a kappa (folklore).

The novel  won  the 2001 James Tiptree Jr. Award for Science Fiction and Commonwealth Writers.

References

External  links
 Hiromi Goto web site

Canadian science fiction novels
2001 Canadian novels
James Tiptree Jr. Award-winning works